CBS 12 may refer to one of the following television stations in the United States:

Current affiliates
KCCW-TV in Walker, Minnesota (O&O)
Satellite of WCCO-TV in Minneapolis/Saint Paul, Minnesota
KEYC-TV in Mankato, Minnesota
KEYT-DT2, a digital channel of KEYT-TV in Santa Barbara, California (cable channel, branded as KCOY 12)
KFVS-TV in Cape Girardeau, Missouri
KHSL-TV in Chico/Redding, California
KSLA in Shreveport, Louisiana
KWCH-DT in Wichita, Kansas
KXII in Sherman, Texas
KXMB-TV in Bismarck, North Dakota
Part of the KX Television Network
WBNG-TV in Binghamton, New York
WDEF-TV in Chattanooga, Tennessee
WJTV in Jackson, Mississippi
WKRC-TV in Cincinnati, Ohio
WPEC in West Palm Beach, Florida
WPRI-TV in Providence, Rhode Island
WRDW-TV in Augusta, Georgia

Formerly affiliated
KCOY-TV in Santa Maria/Santa Barbara/San Luis Obispo, California (1969 to 2021)
KFSN-TV in Fresno, California (1956 to 1961)
KTXS-TV in Sweetwater/Abilene, Texas (1956 to 1979)
KUSG-TV in St. George, Utah (1999 to 2008)
Was a satellite of KUTV in Salt Lake City, Utah
KVIH-TV in Clovis, New Mexico (1956 to 1979)
 Was a satellite of KFDA-TV in Amarillo, Texas
KVOS-TV in Bellingham, Washington (primarily from 1955 to 1979 and secondarily from 1979 to 1987)
WISN-TV in Milwaukee, Wisconsin (1961 to 1977)
WRVA-TV (now WWBT) in Richmond, Virginia (1956 to 1960)